The Ordnungspolizei, abbreviated Orpo, meaning "Order Police", were the uniformed police force in Nazi Germany from 1936 to 1945. The Orpo organisation was absorbed into the Nazi monopoly on power after regional police jurisdiction was removed in favour of the central Nazi government ("Reich-ification", Verreichlichung, of the police). The Orpo was controlled nominally by the Interior Ministry, but its executive functions rested with the leadership of the SS until the end of World War II. Owing to their green uniforms, Orpo were also referred to as Grüne Polizei (green police). The force was first established as a centralised organisation uniting the municipal, city, and rural uniformed police that had been organised on a state-by-state basis.

The Ordnungspolizei encompassed virtually all of Nazi Germany's law-enforcement and emergency response organisations, including fire brigades, coast guard, and civil defence. In the prewar period, Heinrich Himmler, head of the SS, and Kurt Daluege, chief of the Order Police, cooperated in transforming the police force of the Weimar Republic into militarised formations ready to serve the regime's aims of conquest and racial annihilation. Police troops were first formed into battalion-sized formations for the invasion of Poland, where they were deployed for security and policing purposes, also taking part in executions and mass deportations. During World War II, the force had the task of policing the civilian population of the occupied and colonised countries beginning in spring 1940. Orpo's activities escalated to genocide with the invasion of the Soviet Union, Operation Barbarossa. Twenty-three Order Police battalions, formed into independent regiments or attached to Wehrmacht security divisions and Einsatzgruppen, perpetrated mass-murder in the Holocaust and were responsible for widespread crimes against humanity and genocide targeting the civilian population.

History
Heinrich Himmler, head of the SS, was named Chief of German Police in the Interior Ministry on 17 June 1936 after Hitler announced a decree which was to "unify the control of police duties in the Reich". Traditionally, law enforcement in Germany had been a state and local matter. In this role, Himmler was nominally subordinate to Interior Minister Wilhelm Frick. However, the decree effectively subordinated the police to the SS. Himmler gained authority as all of Germany's uniformed law enforcement agencies were amalgamated into the new Ordnungspolizei, whose main office became populated by officers of the SS.

The police were divided into the Ordnungspolizei (Orpo or order police) and the Sicherheitspolizei (SiPo or security police), which had been established in June 1936. The Orpo assumed duties of regular uniformed law enforcement while the SiPo consisted of the secret state police (Geheime Staatspolizei or Gestapo) and criminal investigation police (Kriminalpolizei or Kripo). The Kriminalpolizei was a corps of professional detectives involved in fighting crime and the task of the Gestapo was combating espionage and political dissent. On 27 September 1939, the SS security service, the Sicherheitsdienst (SD) and the SiPo were folded into the Reich Security Main Office (Reichssicherheitshauptamt or RSHA). The RSHA symbolised the close connection between the SS (a party organisation) and the police (a state organisation).

In broad terms, Himmler pursued the amalgamation of SS and police into a form of "State Protection Corps" (Staatsschutzkorps), and used the expanded reach the police powers gave him to persecute ideological opponents and "undesirables" of the Nazi regime such as Jews, freemasons, the churches, homosexuals, Jehovah's Witnesses, and other groups defined as "asocial". The Nazi conception of criminality was racial and biological, holding that criminal traits were hereditary, and had to be exterminated to purify German blood. As a result, even ordinary criminals were consigned to concentration camps to remove them from the German racial community (Volksgemeinschaft) and ultimately exterminate them.

The Order Police played a central role in carrying out the Holocaust. By "both career professionals and reservists, in both battalion formations and precinct service" (Einzeldienst) through providing men for the tasks involved.

Organization
The German Order Police had grown to 244,500 men by mid-1940. The Orpo was under the overall control of Reichsführer-SS Himmler as Chief of the German Police in the Ministry of the Interior. It was initially commanded by SS-Oberstgruppenführer und Generaloberst der Polizei Kurt Daluege. In May 1943, Daluege had a massive heart attack and was removed from duty. He was replaced by SS-Obergruppenführer und General der Waffen-SS und der Polizei Alfred Wünnenberg, who served until the end of the war. By 1941, the Orpo had been divided into the following offices covering every aspect of German law enforcement.

The central command office known as the Ordnungspolizei Hauptamt was located in Berlin. From 1943 it was considered a full SS-Headquarters command. The Orpo main office consisted of Command Department (Kommandoamt), responsible for finance, personnel and medical; Administrative (Verwaltung) charged with pay, pensions and permits; Economic (Wirtschaftsverwaltungsamt); Technical Emergency Service (Technische Nothilfe); Fire Brigades Bureau (Feuerwehren); Colonial Police (Kolonialpolizei); and SS and Police Technical Training Academy (Technische SS-und Polizeiakademie).

Branches of police

 Administration (Verwaltungspolizei) was the administrative branch of the Orpo and had overall command authority for all Orpo police stations. The Verwaltungspolizei also was the central office for record keeping and was the command authority for civilian law enforcement groups, which included the Gesundheitspolizei (health police), Gewerbepolizei (commercial or trade police), and the Baupolizei (building police). In the main towns, Verwaltungspolizei, Schutzpolizei and Kriminalpolizei would be organised into a police administration known as the Polizeipräsidium or Polizeidirektion, which had authority over these police forces in the urban district.
 State protection police (Schutzpolizei des Reiches), state uniformed police in cities and most large towns, which included police-station duties (Revierdienst) and barracked police units for riots and public safety (Kasernierte Polizei).
Municipal protection police (Schutzpolizei der Gemeinden), municipal uniformed police in smaller and some large towns. Although fully integrated into the Ordnungspolizei-system, its police officers were municipal civil servants. The civilian law enforcement in towns with a municipal protection police was not done by the Verwaltungspolizei, but by municipal civil servants. Until 1943 they also had municipal criminal investigation departments, but that year, all such departments with more than 10 detectives, were integrated into the Kripo.
Gendarmerie (state rural police) were tasked with frontier law enforcement to include small communities, rural districts, and mountainous terrain. With the development of a network of motorways or Autobahnen, motorised gendarmerie companies were set up in 1937 to secure the traffic.
 Traffic police (Verkehrspolizei) was the traffic-law enforcement agency and road safety administration of Germany. The organisation patrolled Germany's roads (other than motorways which were controlled by Motorized Gendarmerie) and responded to major accidents. The Verkehrspolizei was also the primary escort service for high Nazi leaders who travelled great distances by automobile.
 Water protection police (Wasserschutzpolizei) was the equivalent of the coast guard and river police. Tasked with the safety and security of Germany's rivers, harbours, and inland waterways, the group also had authority over the SS-Hafensicherungstruppen ("harbour security troops") which were Allgemeine-SS units assigned as port security personnel.
 Fire police (Feuerschutzpolizei) consisted of all professional fire departments under a national command structure.

Hilfspolizei

 The Orpo Hauptamt also had authority over the Freiwillige Feuerwehren, the local volunteer civilian fire brigades. At the height of the Second World War, in response to heavy bombing of Germany's cities, the combined Feuerschutzpolizei and Freiwillige Feuerwehren numbered nearly two million members.
 Air raid protection police (Luftschutzpolizei) was the civil protection service in charge of air raid defence and rescue victims of bombings in connection with the Technische Nothilfe (Technical Emergency Service) and the Feuerschutzpolizei (professional fire departments). Created as the Security and Assistance Service (Sicherheits und Hilfsdienst) in 1935, it was renamed Luftschutzpolizei in April 1942. The air raid network was supported by the Reichsluftschutzbund (Reich Association for Air Raid Precautions) an organisation controlled from 1935 by the Air Ministry under Hermann Göring. The RLB set up an organisation of air raid wardens who were responsible for the safety of a building or a group of houses.
Technical Emergency Corps (Technische Nothilfe; TeNo) was a corps of engineers, technicians and specialists in construction work. The TeNo was created in 1919 to keep the public utilities and essential industries running during the wave of strikes. From 1937, the TeNo became a technical auxiliary corps of the police and was absorbed into Orpo Hauptamt. By 1943, the TeNo had over 100,000 members.
Volunteer Fire Department (Feuerwehren), volunteer fire departments, conscripted fire departments and industrial fire departments were auxiliary police subordinate to the Ordnungspolizei.
 Radio protection (Funkschutz) was made up of SS and Orpo security personnel assigned to protect German broadcasting stations from attack and sabotage. The Funkschutz was also the primary investigating service which detected illegal reception of foreign radio broadcasts.
 Urban and rural emergency police (Stadt- und Landwacht) created in 1942 as a part-time police reserve. Abolished in 1945 with the creation of the Volksturm.
 Auxiliary Police (Schutzmannschaft) was the collaborationist auxiliary police in occupied Eastern Europe.

Sonderpolizei
The Sonderpolizei were the special police authorities not subordinate to the Hauptamt Ordnungspolizei or the Reichssicherheitshauptamt: 
 Reichsbahnfahndungsdienst, the "Railway criminal investigative service", subordinate to the Deutsche Reichsbahn.
 Bahnschutzpolizei (Railway protection police), subordinate to the Deutsche Reichsbahn.
 SS-Bahnschutz replaced the Bahnschutzpolizei within the Reich territory from 1944.
 Postal protection (Postschutz) comprised roughly 45,000 members and was tasked with the security of Germany's Reichspost, which was responsible not only for the mail but other communications media such as the telephone and telegraph systems. 
 SS-Postschutz; created with the transfer of the Postschutz from the Reichministry of Post to the Allgemeine-SS in 1942.
 Forest Protection Service, (Forstschutzkommando) under the Reichsforstamt.
 Jagdpolizei (Hunting Police), under the Reichsforstamt. It was largely exercised through the Deutsche Jägerschaft. 
 Zollgrenzschutz (Customs Border Guards), exercised through the Border guard and the Customs Authorities under the Ministry of Finance.
 Flurschutzpolizei (Agricultural Field Police), under the Ministry of Agriculture.
 Factory protection police (Werkschutzpolizei) were the security guards of Nazi Germany. Its personnel were civilians employed by industrial enterprises, and typically were issued paramilitary uniforms. They were ultimately subordinated to the Ministry of Aviation.
 Deichpolizei (Dam and Dyke Police), subordinated to the Ministry of Economy.

Police battalions

Invasion of Poland

Between 1939 and 1945, the Ordnungspolizei maintained military formations, trained and outfitted by the main police offices within Germany. Specific duties varied widely from unit to unit and from one year to another. Generally, the Order Police were not directly involved in frontline combat, except for Ardennes in May 1940, and the Siege of Leningrad in 1941. The first 17 battalion formations (from 1943 renamed SS-Polizei-Bataillone) were deployed by Orpo in September 1939 along with the Wehrmacht army in the invasion of Poland. The battalions guarded Polish prisoners of war behind the German lines, and carried out expulsion of Poles from Reichsgaue under the banner of Lebensraum. They also committed atrocities against both the Catholic and the Jewish populations as part of those "resettlement actions". After hostilities had ceased, the battalionssuch as Reserve Police Battalion 101took up the role of security forces, patrolling the perimeters of the Jewish ghettos in German-occupied Poland (the internal ghetto security issues were managed by the SS, SD, and the Criminal Police, in conjunction with the Jewish ghetto administration).

Each battalion consisted of approximately 500 men armed with light infantry weapons. In the east, each company also had a heavy machine-gun detachment. Administratively, the Police Battalions remained under the Chief of Police Kurt Daluege, but operationally they were under the authority of regional SS and Police Leaders (SS- und Polizeiführer), who reported up a separate chain of command directly to Reichsführer-SS Heinrich Himmler. The battalions were used for various auxiliary duties, including the so-called anti-partisan operations, support of combat troops, and construction of defence works (i.e. Atlantic Wall). Some of them were focused on traditional security roles as an occupying force, while others were directly involved in actions designed to inflict terror and in the ensuing Holocaust. While they were similar to Waffen-SS, they were not part of the thirty-eight Waffen-SS divisions, and should not be confused with them, including the national 4th SS Polizei Panzergrenadier Division. The battalions were originally numbered in series from 1 to 325, but in February 1943 were renamed and renumbered from 1 to about 37, to distinguish them from the Schutzmannschaft auxiliary battalions recruited from local population in German-occupied areas.

Invasion of the Soviet Union

The Order Police battalions, operating both independently and in conjunction with the Einsatzgruppen, became an integral part of the Final Solution in the two years following the attack on the Soviet Union on 22 June 1941, Operation Barbarossa. The first mass-murder of 3,000 Jews by Police Battalion 309 occurred in occupied Białystok on 12 July 1941. Police battalions were part of the first and second wave of murders in 1941–42 in the territories of Poland annexed by the Soviet Union and also during the killing operations within the 1939 borders of the USSR, whether as part of Order Police regiments, or as separate units reporting directly to the local SS and Police Leaders. They included the Reserve Police Battalion 101 from Hamburg, Battalion 133 of the Nürnberg Order Police, Police Battalions 45, 309 from Koln, and 316 from Bottrop-Oberhausen. Their murder operations bore the brunt of the Holocaust by bullet on the Eastern Front. In the immediate aftermath of World War II, this latter role was obscured both by the lack of court evidence and by deliberate obfuscation, while most of the focus was on the better-known Einsatzgruppen ("Operational groups") who reported to the Reichssicherheitshauptamt (RSHA) under Reinhard Heydrich.

Order Police battalions involved in direct killing operations were responsible for at least 1 million murders. Starting in 1941 the Battalions and local Order Police units helped to transport Jews from the ghettos in both Poland and the USSR (and elsewhere in occupied Europe) to the concentration and extermination camps, as well as operations to hunt down and murder Jews outside the ghettos. The Order Police were one of the two primary sources from which the Einsatzgruppen drew personnel in accordance with manpower needs (the other being the Waffen-SS).

In 1942, the majority of the police battalions were re-consolidated into thirty SS and Police Regiments. These formations were intended for garrison security duty, anti-partisan functions, and to support Waffen-SS units on the Eastern Front. Notably, the regular military police of the Wehrmacht (Feldgendarmerie) were separate from the Ordnungspolizei.

Waffen-SS Police Division

The primary combat arm of the Ordnungspolizei was the SS Polizei Division of the Waffen-SS. The division was formed in October 1939, when thousands of members of the Orpo were drafted and placed together with artillery and signals units transferred from the army. The division consisted of four police regiments composed of Orpo personnel and was typically used to rotate police members into a military situation, so as not to lose police personnel to the general draft of the Wehrmacht or to the full SS divisions of the regular Waffen-SS. Very late in the war several Orpo SS-Police regiments were transferred to the Waffen-SS to form the 35th SS-Police Grenadier Division. Cossack Orpo units were rolled into the XV SS Cossack Cavalry Corps with other units to nominally form 2nd Cossack Division.

Orpo and SS relations

By the start of the Second World War in 1939, the SS had effectively gained complete operational control over the German Police, although outwardly the SS and Police still functioned as separate entities. The Ordnungspolizei maintained its own system of insignia and Orpo ranks as well as distinctive police uniforms. Under an SS directive known as the "Rank Parity Decree", policemen were highly encouraged to join the SS and, for those who did so, a special police insignia known as the SS Membership Runes for Order Police was worn on the breast pocket of the police uniform.

In 1940, standard practice in the German Police was to grant equivalent SS rank to all police generals. Police generals who were members of the SS were referred to simultaneously by both rank titlesfor instance, a Generalleutnant in the Police who was also an SS member would be referred to as SS Gruppenführer und Generalleutnant der Polizei. In 1942, SS membership became mandatory for police generals, with SS collar insignia (overlaid on police green backing) worn by all police officers ranked Generalmajor and above.

The distinction between the police and the SS had virtually disappeared by 1943 with the creation of the SS and Police Regiments, which were consolidated from earlier police security battalions. SS officers now routinely commanded police troops and police generals serving in command of military troops were granted equivalent SS rank in the Waffen-SS. In August 1944, when Himmler was appointed Chef des Ersatzheeres (Chief of the Home Army), all police generals automatically were granted Waffen-SS rank because they had authority over the prisoner-of-war camps.

See also
Ranks and insignia of the Ordnungspolizei
Police Long Service Award
Glossary of Nazi Germany
Schutzmannschaft, auxiliary policemen raised from local populations in occupied Eastern Europe during World War II
Hilfspolizei, a type of German police unit
Sonderdienst (Special Services)
Police Regiment Centre

Notes

References
 Browning, Christopher, Nazi Policy, Jewish Workers, German Killers, Cambridge University Press, 2000. .
 
 
 
 
 

 

 
 
 

Further reading
 
 Nix Philip and Jerome Georges (2006). The Uniformed Police Forces of the Third Reich 1933-1945'', Leandoer & Ekholm. 

Allgemeine SS
Holocaust terminology
Nazi SS
Ordnungspolizei
Police forces of Nazi Germany
Police of Nazi Germany